Scaler, also known as Scaler: The Shapeshifting Chameleon, is a video game released in 2004 by Global Star Software for the GameCube, Xbox, and PlayStation 2 video game consoles. Scaler follows the story of a lizard-loving 12-year-old boy named Bobby "Scaler" Jenkins who stumbles across an evil plot to dominate the world through use of mutated lizards.

Gameplay
The main attraction of Scaler is the ability to transform into five different types of mutant lizards, each one giving some sort of advantage depending on the environment. The different transformations are the Bakudan - a tiny, bomb-toting reptile, the Krock - a spiky, rolling armored sphere, the Doozum - a large flying dolphin lizard with sonar attacks, the Fruzard - a reptile with the ability to snipe from a distance, and the Swoom - a penguin-like lizard adapted to swim. As the player journeys to different areas of the world, he or she will occasionally be given a challenge to defeat the creatures he or she wishes to transform into, thus enabling upon completion the ability to use their unique abilities to the player's advantage. Only select areas in which Scaler journeys allow him to transform into these creatures, and only one of this five forms are usable in these locations. By feeding Reppy Klokkies, she secretes a gaseous ooze that give Scaler some useful upgrades.

In addition, Scaler faces a wide variety of enemies, all of them proving to be a unique challenge in their own ways. Some enemies shoot projectiles, while others use direct combat or stealth. The gameplay is diverse in this way, presenting the player with a number of different strategies to devise if he or she wishes to overcome the obstacles.

Scaler may also be seen frequently riding upon long tube-like pathways around the map that charge his electrical bombs, rendering him ready for combat as soon as he departs from the tubes. These small, narrow tubes also carry him from place to place, allowing him to collect the eggs he needs and to get back to Reppy in a reasonable time span.

Plot
Prior to the start of the game, lizard-loving animal activist Bobby "Scaler" Jenkins discovers that five extra-dimensional humanoid reptilian creatures - the leader, Looger, and his henchmen Jazz, Rhombus, Bootcamp, and Turbine - have disguised themselves as humans and intend to conquer the multiverse. Looger and his subordinates discover that Scaler knows of their plot and kidnap him; the game opens with Bootcamp interrogating Scaler by electrocuting him. During the torture, Bootcamp, frustrated by Scaler's taunts, accidentally opens an extra-dimensional portal, transforming Scaler into a blue-skinned reptilian humanoid and releasing him from his restraints. Scaler escapes through the portal, and Looger and his henchmen follow after him.

Scaler finds himself in an parallel universe where he encounters another reptilian man named Leon, who Scaler notes as having the same name as his estranged father. Leon challenges Scaler to retrieve a lizard egg being incubated in a mysterious mechanism. When Scaler does so and returns the egg to Leon, he persuades Leon to let him help retrieve the rest of the eggs scattered in the multiverse. Leon grudgingly agrees, and reveals that Scaler can exchange Klokkies (balls of energy that Scaler obtains by defeating hostile creatures) with his pet Repodactyl Reppy (a large, six-eyed, flying, laser-shooting, manta-like creature) to improve Scaler's abilities, including sharper claws, camouflage, and the ability to discharge static electricity from his body. Leon also reveals that Scaler can obtain the ability to transform into other creatures by defeating enough of that creature. Among the transformations Scaler obtains during the game are Bakudan (a demonic creature that can spawn bombs at will), Krock (a spiky creature that can curl into a ball and roll at high speeds), Doozum (a flying creature that can shoot sonic projectiles), Fruzard (a frilled chicken-like creature that can shoot projectiles) and Swoom (an amphibious penguin-like creature).

As they travel into this strange world of isolated and variegated islands filled with vicious (both humanoid and not) reptiles with the mysterious Leon, aboard Reppy, Scaler discovers more of Looger's secrets. He learns that Looger controls a network of unstable portals that are the only connections between the different dimensions in the "multiverse" through the use of a mysterious device. Any being in control of these portals would have the ability to move freely between the different worlds and even capture them. And that is exactly what Looger plans to do, by mutating and then cloning en masse lizards in the form of horrible mutants. All of this is done in order to invade and conquer every plane of the multiverse. It becomes clear that Scaler must help Leon to rescue all the eggs and stop Looger, or lose all of the universes to darkness.

Meanwhile, due to the time spent with Bobby, the long-lost memories of Leon slowly began resurfacing and Scaler discovers that Leon is in fact his father. Years prior, he was a scientist, and while performing an experiment with his invention, the portal compass, he was dragged accidentally by his device into Looger's dimension through a portal, and immediately imprisoned by Looger for years.  The tortures inflicted on him by Looger in attempt to make him reveal more about his technology left Leon an amnesiac, stripping him from most of his memories. Only now is he able to escape the lonely island, where he had met his son. So Leon never, as Bobby thought, abandoned him and his mother. Leon is overjoyed to not only finally remember who he is, but also to see his son again, who has become a great hero. However, Scaler struggles a little to accept the truth and accept a father who for so long time he have thought being "a loser freak," who forced his mother to take two jobs to scrape by. In the end, however, he forgives his father, as after all it wasn't his fault at all.

After defeating Jazz, Rhombus, Turbine, Bootcamp and a few of the mutant monsters, all the while rescuing the 20 remaining lizard eggs, Scaler and Leon arrive at Looger's stronghold. After defeating him and reclaiming the portal compass, they rush to a last portal meant to bring them home but Leon, having returned behind to save an egg fallen from a hole in Scaler's sack, remains on the other side of the portal while Bobby crosses over it. Bobby is back in Looger's basement, and it at last occurs to him that his father did not make it in time. The portal closes, leaving Bobby screaming in horror for having, again, lost his father.

By unlocking the secret ending, an unexpected event takes place: as Leon said, if the player alters the multiverse by any means, it can produce unpredictable effects, even the merging of different versions of history. So, when Bobby screams in horror from the second loss of his father, the basement door opens behind him, and his father stands in its frame, concerned by the sudden scream. By defeating Looger, Bobby did in fact alter time, and Leon was never captured by the evil reptile overlord, meaning that he technically never left his family. Quite the opposite has happened in this timeframe, and the Jenkins family are living together in that same house that Looger would have owned. Bobby is overjoyed but soon discovers that he still has his chameleon tongue, and the reflex to eat flies, much to his own disgust.

Not much later, Leon returns to the basement again, revealing by a monologue to the player (breaking the fourth wall), that he in fact maintained the memories of his journey with Bobby, despite pretending just before to not remember anything, and that he has kept the portal compass, expressing his nostalgia of Reppy and hoping that in future there will be more adventures.

Reception

Scaler received "average" reviews on all platforms according to the review aggregation website Metacritic. While receiving praise for its high production values and gameplay, some reviewers criticized it for having an unexciting plot and formulaic design.

References

External links
 Scaler official website 
 

2004 video games
3D platform games
Alien invasions in video games
Behaviour Interactive games
GameCube games
Kidnapping in fiction
Platform games
PlayStation 2 games
Reptiles in popular culture
Single-player video games
Take-Two Interactive games
Therianthropy
Video games about reptiles
Video games about shapeshifting
Video games developed in Canada
Video games about parallel universes
Video games set on fictional islands
Xbox games
Global Star Software games